António de Sousa Coutinho was the 18th Governor of Portuguese Ceylon. Coutinho was appointed in 1655 under John IV of Portugal, he was Governor until 1656. He was succeeded by António de Amaral de Meneses.

References

Governors of Portuguese Ceylon
16th-century Portuguese people
1668 deaths
Year of birth unknown
17th-century Portuguese people